Martin Fredholm (born 12 January 1977) is a Swedish orienteer. He's a multiple time world champion in trail orienteering. He is currently a member in the IOF Trail Orienteering Commission.

He also provides the scoring system in multiple orienteering events, such as World Trail Orienteering Championships.

World Championships

References

External links
 

Living people
Swedish orienteers
Male orienteers
Trail orienteers
World Orienteering Championships medalists
1977 births
21st-century Swedish people